Meadowlands Sports Complex, or Meadowlands, is a New Jersey Transit train station that is the western terminus for the Meadowlands Rail Line located at the Meadowlands Sports Complex in East Rutherford, New Jersey.

The station is situated equidistant between Meadowlands Racetrack, Meadowlands Arena, American Dream and MetLife Stadium to which there is a direct aerial connection.

NJ Transit operates the BetMGM Meadowlands Rail Line to the station for stadium events when 50,000 or more attendees are expected. Despite the opening of American Dream in 2019, the station is not yet operating daily. NJ Transit says daily service may begin "once the rail system is resilient enough that doing so won’t adversely affect NJ Transit commuters".

On September 14, 2022, NJ Transit entered into a naming rights agreement with BetMGM, a sports betting company owned by MGM Resorts International, to rename the rail line for $3 million over the next 3 years.

Station layout

Opening
The Meadowlands station opened on July 20, 2009 when a group of dignitaries including New Jersey Governor Jon Corzine, New York Giants owner John Mara, New York Jets owner Woody Johnson, and players from the Giants and Jets rode out on a special train from Hoboken for a ribbon-cutting ceremony. The station officially opened to the public on July 26, 2009 for the championship game of the CONCACAF Gold Cup tournament between the United States and Mexico. As many as 6,000 of the 80,000 attendees at the soccer game arrived at the complex using the station.

In August 2009, New Jersey assemblymen Frederick Scalera and Gary Schaer advocated using the train station as a park and ride facility with weekday rush-hour service to help alleviate traffic congestion on the roadways leading to New York City, but the New Jersey Sports and Exposition Authority indicated this could create conflicts on evenings when other events are scheduled, such as those at the Izod Center.

Although the new train service worked well for the first two regular season NFL games—when approximately 6,000-7,000 football fans arrived by rail—the first problems occurred on September 23, 2009, when 20,000 attendees at a U2 concert crammed onto trains.  Some concertgoers had to wait up to two hours to board trains after the show, as the rail line can only accommodate a maximum capacity of 10,000 people per hour.

References

External links 

 
 
 
 

Meadowlands Sports Complex
East Rutherford, New Jersey
NJ Transit Rail Operations stations
Railway stations in Bergen County, New Jersey
Railway stations in the United States opened in 2009
2009 establishments in New Jersey